All My Life may refer to:

Film and television 
 All My Life (1966 film), an American experimental short film by Bruce Baillie
 All My Life (2004 film), a Philippine film starring Kristine Hermosa and Aga Muhlach
 All My Life (2008 film), an Egyptian film by Maher Sabry
 All My Life (2020 film), an American drama film by Marc Meyers
 All My Life (TV series), a 2009 Philippine drama

Albums 
 All My Life (Jim Witter album) or the title song (see below), 1999
 All My Life (Jocelyn Enriquez album) or the title song, 2003
 All My Life (Viper album) or the title song, 2007
 All My Life: Their Greatest Hits or the title song (see below), by K-Ci & JoJo, 2005

Songs 
 "All My Life" (Alyona Lanskaya song), 2012
 "All My Life" (Billy Joel song), 2007
 "All My Life" (Foo Fighters song), 2002
 "All My Life" (Jim Witter song), 1999
 "All My Life" (K-Ci & JoJo song), 1998
 "All My Life" (Kenny Rogers song), 1983
 "All My Life" (Linda Ronstadt song), 1990
 "All My Life" (Uriah Heep song), 1972
 "All My Life (In the Ghetto)", by Jay Rock, 2008
 "All My Life", by America from Silent Letter, 1979
 "All My Life", by Bobby Vinton, B-side of the single "Sealed with a Kiss", 1960
 "All My Life", by Flo Rida from Mail on Sunday, 2008
 "All My Life", by Krezip from Plug It In, 2007
 "All My Life", by L.A.P.D. from Who's Laughing Now, 1991
 "All My Life", by Major Lazer from Major Lazer Essentials, 2018
 "All My Life", by Mariah Carey from Glitter, 2001
 "All My Life", by MC Magic from Magic City, 2006
 "All My Life", by N Force, 2008
 "All My Life", by Ozzy Osbourne from Ordinary Man, 2020
 "All My Life", by Styles P featuring Akon, a non-album track from Time Is Money, 2006
 "All My Life", by Wynter Gordon from With the Music I Die, 2011
 "All My Life", written by Sam H. Stept, 1936

See also 
 All of My Life (disambiguation)